Kugluktuk High School, known commonly as 'KHS', is in Kugluktuk, Nunavut, Canada. The school, which serves a town of some 1,500 people, has about 220 students from Grades 6 to 12. Kugluktuk is the most westerly hamlet in the Territory of Nunavut.

The high school, through the "Kugluktuk High School Athletics Association" also known as the "Kugluktuk Grizzlies", has created a non-profit, stay-in-school organization that uses sport and recreation opportunities as incentives for staying in school, and making healthy lifestyle choices. Currently, the membership has over 100 students. Through a variety of fundraisers, they provide the youth in both schools with opportunities largely centred around sport and travel.

Next door to KHS is Jimmy Hikok Ilihakvik serving students in K - Grade 5.

The school and the lacrosse team were featured in The Grizzlies, a drama about suicide in the community.

External links
 Virtual tour
Official site

High schools in Nunavut
Kitikmeot Region
Educational institutions in Canada with year of establishment missing